Niels Busk (born 2 August 1942 in Vadum)
is a Danish politician and
Member of the European Parliament with the Venstre,
part of the Alliance of Liberals and Democrats for Europe and sits on
the European Parliament's Committee on Agriculture and Rural Development
and its Committee on Fisheries.

He is a substitute for the
Committee on the Environment, Public Health and Food Safety and a member of the
Delegation to the ACP-EU Joint Parliamentary Assembly.

Education
 1959: Lower secondary school-leaving certificate
 1962: Danish Royal Lifeguards
 1963: Lieutenant
 1965: Dalum Agricultural College

Career
 Since 1981: Major in the Reserve
 Since 1981: Chairman of the vice-chairman and board member of various trade organisations, financial companies and farming bodies
 Since 1999: Member of the European Parliament
 Since 1999: Member of the Executive of Venstre, Denmark's Liberal Party
 Knight of the Dannebrog
 Commendation for good service in the national defence reserve force
 Nobel Peace Prize as active member of UN Peace-Keeping Forces
 UN Emergency Force decoration

See also
 2004 European Parliament election in Denmark

External links
 
 
 

1942 births
Living people
Venstre (Denmark) MEPs
MEPs for Denmark 2004–2009
MEPs for Denmark 1999–2004
People from Aalborg Municipality